Cathrin Puhl (born 4 April 1994) is a German rhythmic gymnast. She competed at the 2012 Summer Olympics and finished in tenth place in the team exercise.

References

External links
Personal webpage
 
 
 Cathrin Puhl im Porträt. olympia.ard.de
 Puhl, Cathrin GER. iat.uni-leipzig.de
 
 

1994 births
Living people
German rhythmic gymnasts
Gymnasts at the 2012 Summer Olympics
Olympic gymnasts of Germany
People from Lebach
Sportspeople from Saarland